Réginald Charles Gagnon, known as Cayouche (born 7th January 1949), is an Acadian singer-songwriter of Acadian French country music. He was born in Moncton, New Brunswick on the eastern coast of Canada.

Early life 

At the age of thirteen, Cayouche left eastern Canada with his mother to go live in the suburbs of Boston, Massachusetts, in the United States. He later joined the United States Marine Corps when he was 19. While serving, he took part in the Vietnam War. However, he never went into combat. When his military service was over, he returned to Leominster, Massachusetts where he married and had two sons, Joshua Paul Gagnon (1972) and Jason Charles Gagnon (1973) and spent the next ten years living there. In 1979, he returned to Canada and went as a nomad with his back pack and his guitar, taking the first small step into his country-folk music career.

Career 
His nickname comes from the United States. He says that people would tell him: "t'es pas Acayen t'es Acayouche", meaning "you're not Acadian, you're Acayouche". "Acayouche" later became "Cayouche", which is now his nickname.

Even before the release of their first album in 1994, a Radio-Canada team had noticed that the Cayouche phenomenon was already alive and well in the Acadian Peninsula. About 25 years later, in the same place, again almost all people passing by know Cayouche and his character.

Thanks to his first album, Cayouche made a phenomenal entry into the music market in Acadia. Reaching a sales figure of more than 15,000 copies in a fairly small market, the album "Un vieux hippy" is surely part of the record collection of most Acadian families. Cayouche, a very simple musician, sings the everyday routine in his slightly coarse voice. Shortly after the release of the album "Un vieux hippie", fans who attended his shows could sing their hearts out to all of the lyrics of his songs such as "La chain de mon Tracteur", "Exporter“ A "or even "The kids kick". The album "An Old Hippy" surely contains many of the new classics of Acadian songs.

Especially known for his uniting and festive performances, the singer has maintained a constant popularity throughout Canada and Europe. The "Cayouche phenomenon" gets people from all generations singing and dancing, touching the hearts of the young and old in almost every song. He is among the few Acadian popular artists in history to have sold more 100,000 albums.

Among his biggest hits are Export A, La chaine de mon tracteur, L’alcool au Volant, C’est ça mon Acadie and La reine du bingo. Cayouche, who now lives in Maisonnette, New Brunswick, was the subject of a documentary film entitled "Cayouche, Le Temps d'une bière" or in English: "Cayouche : Time for a beer” by Maurice André Aubin in 2009.

Concerts and festivals 
 Outdoor Concert Extérieur - Memramcook, New Brunswick, Monument-Lefebvre Parking Lot (September 26 2020)
 CMA Show August 2019 – Moncton, New Brunswick – Riverfront Park
 The Lobster Trap – Moncton, New Brunswick – The 63
 Back to School 2015 – Moncton, New Brunswick – The 63
 Cayouche / Menoncle Jason – Moncton, New Brunswick – Le Coude
 1755 / Bois-Joli / Cayouche -Shediac, New Brunswick – Festival Arena
 Grey Rock Casino 2019 – Edmundston, New Brunswick
 Festival Western 2017 – Bonaventure, Canada
 Festival Country of St-Georges 2019 – Quebec, Canada
 Concert 2019 – Madawaska County, New Brunswick – The Grey Rock Casino

Discography 
 Un Vieux Hippy (released, 1994)
 Moitié-moitié (released, 1996)
 Roule, roule (released, 1999)
 Last Call (released, 2003)
 Le rappel (released, 2011)
 Les Meilleures Tounes (released, 13 December 2019)

Songs
 Mon bicycle, ma musique (3:04)
 Au camp (3:59)
 Une place au chaud (4:05)
 L'Auberge du Quai de l'Horloge (4:23)
 La 6 49 (4:04)
 Pills à nerfs (6:01)
 Red Haired Boy (instrumental) (2:34)
 Pas d'icitte, pas d'ailleurs (3:23)
 Grand-Père Jos (3:55)
 Le frigidaire de mon chum (5:03)
 Le blues à Cay (4:09)
 Viens faire un tour (4:45)
 La Reine Du Bingo (3:50)
 La Chaine De Mon Tracteur (2:16)
 Laurie (3:00)
 Last Call (3:00)
 L'alcool au volant (3:20)
 Dans la city
 Goo'day
 Bootlegger
 Le frigidaire (4:21)
 C'est du fun à être fou
 Les enfants à coup d'bottes
 J'ai 40 ans (3:40)
 Moi j'm'en rappelle
 Export "A"
 La crotte dans la pipe
 Le nord du Nouveau-Brunswick
 L'hiver s'en vient
 Innocent
 Le p'tit Jeep à André
 Le bon vieux temps
 Les bas de laine
 Le rappel
 Fume fume
 Captain Morgan
 Francine
 Reel du printemps
 La dérive
 Marie Madeleine
 Vivre et laisser vivre
 Picassou / Heather Hill
 Écoutez
 Du thé
 J'ai fumé le sapin	
 Tu M'as Flushé (3:29)				
 Le Portrait de mon Père (4:12)		
 Roule, Roule (4:36)

Top Songs 
 La chaîne de mon tracteur
 La 6 49
 Grand-Père Jos
 L'alcool au volant
 La Reine du Bingo
 Fume Fume
 Export "A"
 La crotte dans la pipe
 Le frigidaire
 Dans la city
 Le bon vieux temps
 Viens faire un tour
 Écoutez

Filmography 

 Cayouche, Le Temps d'une bière (2009)
 Pour l'amour du country (2001–2012)

Record Labels 
 Production Péninsule
 Production JGC57

References

Further reading 
 Cayouche – Wikipedia (français)

Canadian country singer-songwriters
1948 births
Living people
Musicians from Moncton
Acadian people
French-language singers of Canada
Canadian expatriates in the United States